Paul D. Schibli (born in Montreal, Quebec) is a Canadian animator, storyboard artist, director and painter. He directed The Raccoons series as well as the feature film The Nutcracker Prince. Schibli wrote and illustrated the children's book Monsters Don't Count. He is an oil painter who has done floral work and landscapes.

Works

Director
The Christmas Raccoons (1980)
The Raccoons (1987–1988)
The Nutcracker Prince (1990)
Tooth Fairy, Where Are You? (1991)
The Teddy Bears' Christmas (1992)
I Yabba-Dabba Do! (1993 - supervising director: overseas)
All Dogs Go to Heaven 2 (1996 - sequence director)
The Secret World of Og (2006)

Art Department
The Raccoons: Let's Dance! (1984 - designer)
The Care Bears Battle the Freeze Machine (1984 - storyboard artist)
The Nutcracker Prince (1990 - storyboard artist)
Tooth Fairy, Where Are You? (1991 - designer, storyboard artist)
The Teddy Bears' Christmas (1992 - storyboard artist)
Problem Child (1994 - storyboard artist)
The Busy World of Richard Scarry (1996 - storyboard artist)

Animation
Wait Till Your Father Gets Home (1973 – animator, layout artist)
The Happy Prince (1974 – animator)
The Little Brown Burro (1978 – animator)
The Christmas Raccoons (1980 – animation designer, animation director)
The Raccoons on Ice (1981 - designer, animation director, character designer, original characters)
The Raccoons and the Lost Star (1982 - designer, animation director, character designer, original characters)
The Raccoons: Let's Dance! (1983 - animator, animation director, layout artist)
The Care Bears Battle the Freeze Machine (1984 - animation director)
The Nutcracker Prince (1990 - character designer)
The Raccoons (1989-1991 - original animation design)
Tooth Fairy, Where Are You? (1991 - animation layout artist)
The Teddy Bears' Christmas (1992 - animation layout artist, character designer)
The Town Santa Forgot (1993 - overseas animation director)
Hollyrock-a-Bye Baby (1993 - overseas animation director)

References

External links

Artist website
Official site

20th-century Canadian male artists
20th-century Canadian painters
21st-century Canadian male artists
21st-century Canadian painters
Artists from Montreal
Canadian animated film directors
Canadian male painters
Canadian storyboard artists
Film directors from Montreal
Living people
Year of birth missing (living people)